Richard Southby (1623 – 7 January 1704) was an English politician who sat in the House of Commons  in 1659 and from 1679 to 1689.

Southby was the son of John Southby of Carswell Manor in the parish of Buckland in Berkshire (now Oxfordshire) and his wife, Elizabeth daughter and heiress of William Wiseman of Steventon in Berkshire (now Oxfordshire). His father was  MP for Berkshire. Southby matriculated at  Lincoln College, Oxford on 14 May 1641 aged 17 and entered Gray's Inn on 4 Nov 1646.

In 1659, Southby was elected Member of Parliament for Cirencester in the Third Protectorate Parliament.

In 1660, Southby stood unsuccessfully at Berkshire  for the Convention Parliament. He was elected MP for Berkshire in 1679 and sat until 1689.  In 1696 he was High Sheriff of Berkshire.
 
Southby married Katherine, daughter and co-heiress of Robert Strange of Somerford Keynes in Wiltshire and they had nine children. He died in 1704 and was buried at Buckland.

References

1623 births
1704 deaths
Alumni of Lincoln College, Oxford
Members of Gray's Inn
People from Buckland, Oxfordshire
High Sheriffs of Berkshire
Members of the Parliament of England for Berkshire
English MPs 1659
English MPs 1679
English MPs 1681
English MPs 1685–1687